Zdenko Hans Skraup (March 3, 1850 – September 10, 1910) was a Czech-Austrian chemist who discovered the Skraup reaction, the first quinoline synthesis.

Life
Skraup was born in Prague, where he attended the Oberrealschule from 1860 till 1866 and subsequently studied (1866–1871) at the Technical University of Prague. After being assistant of Heinrich Ludwig Buff for less than a year he worked at a china factory but changed to the mint in Vienna in 1873.

He became assistant of Rochleder in 1873, although a promotion in his old job was granted. Rochleder died the following year, but Skraup stayed with his successors Franz Schneider and Adolf Lieben.

He received his Ph.D. from the University of Gießen March 17, 1875. He finished his habilitation at the University of Vienna in 1879, but because his degree was from a German university he had to wait until 1881 till he became professor at the Vienna Trade Academie.

In 1886, he changed to the University of Graz and to the University of Vienna in 1906.

References
  
  
 

1850 births
1910 deaths
Austrian chemists
Czech chemists